Keep Shelly in Athens are a Greek chillwave duo from Athens. They formed in 2010, and were quickly signed to the vinyl imprint label of independent music blog Gorilla vs. Bear, Forest Family Records. In November of that year, they released their debut 12" EP, In Love with Dusk, which quickly sold out due to much internet hype. They are currently signed to Cascine Records, who released their debut full-length album in 2013.

History 
The group was formed sometime in 2010 when a producer known only as RΠЯ started seeking out someone with whom to perform newly written songs. Through a mutual friend,  Sarah P. was introduced to RΠЯ, and they soon began to perform together. The band name was conceived as a pun on Kypseli, a neighbourhood of Athens. The band have now toured North America and Europe as a four piece, and in 2012 played as a feature artist at the Coachella Valley Music and Arts Festival.  On 17 January 2014,  Sarah P. announced  she was no longer in Keep Shelly in Athens. In March 2014 the band announced a new singer, Myrtha. In 2017, the band released a new LP, Philokalia, armed with another new singer, Jessica Bell. In 2021 the main member of Keep Shelly in Athens announces a new collaborative singles series with guest vocalists from around the world.

Style 
The band's musical style is influenced by Saint Etienne and Air, whereas  Sarah P.'s vocal style is influenced by Tracey Thorn and Nancy Sinatra.

Discography

Mini-albums, EPs and singles 
 In Love with Dusk 12" (Forest Family Records, 2010)
 Running Out of You
 Cremona Memories
 Fokionos Negri Street
 Rainy Night
 Don't Be Afraid
 In Love with Dusk
 Body Language – You Can (Keep Shelly in Athens Remix)
 Campus Martius 12" (Planet Mu, 2011)
 Solar Bears –	Cub (Keep Shelly in Athens Remix)
 The Chains
 Campus Martius
 Struggle With Yourself
 Our Own Dream 12" (Forest Family Records, 2011)
 Lazy Noon
 Our Own Dream
 ABADABAD – California Birds (Keep Shelly in Athens Remix)
 DIY
 Fairytale
 A) The Rogue Superhero B) Ready To Pay The Price
 Keep Shelly in Athens CS (Sixteen Tambourines Records, 2011)
 Running Out Of You
 Cremona Memories
 A Tear In My I
 Yellow Man
 Hauntin' Me
 Fokionos Negri Street
 Don't Be Afraid
 Running Out Of You (Memory Tapes Remix)
 Late Night Later Night CS (split with Disclosure) (Loud and Quiet Cassettes, 2011)
 Running Out of You
 Hauntin' Me
 Yellow Man
 Disclosure – Carnival
 Disclosure – I Love That You Know
 Disclosure – Blue You
 Hauntin' Me 7" (Transparent, 2011)
 Hauntin' Me
 Song To Cheer You Up
 Fractals (Friends of Friends, 2015)
 Fractals
 Fractals (Tomas Barfod Remix)
Introvert  EP (Keep Shelly in Athens, 2018)
 Introvert	2:18
 Livin'	4:23
 Celebrity	3:40
 Don't Need 'Em	5:22
 No Looking Back	5:04
 Epilogue	2:11
Bendable / Glistening 7" (Cascine, 2018)
 Bendable	3:28
 Glistening	4:17
(Don't Fear) The Reaper Single (Keep Shelly in Athens, 2019)
 (Don't Fear) The Reaper 3'23
 Sunny Day EP (Keep Shelly in Athens, 2019)
 Fight	3:06
 Sunny Day	3:17
 Giving	2:43
 California Tears	3:53
 I Don't Need You (feat. Ocean Hope)	4:12
 9 Years EP (Keep Shelly in Athens, 2019)
 Human Stars	3:58
 Cyclades	4:44
 Frantic	3:45
 Late Summer 	3:30
 9 Years 	4:28
 Steady To Go EP (Keep Shelly in Athens, 2020)
 You've Got a Kitty On a Timer 4'02
 Horizon's Glow 4'12
 Steady To Go 4'27
 I Won't Cry 3'35
 Highs And Lows 5'09
 Back to Reality – Single (Keep Shelly in Athens, 2020)
 Back to Reality  (feat. Vauxhall Underground) 4'28
 Just Like In The Movies (feat. Vauxhall Underground) 2'34
 Just Like In The Movies (Instrumental) 2'34
 Early – Single (Keep Shelly in Athens, 2021)
 Early (Instrumental) 2'44
 You – Single (Keep Shelly in Athens, 2021)
 You (feat. Georgia Hurd) 4'32
 Nea Kypseli / Antetokounmpo – Single (Keep Shelly in Athens, 2021)
 Nea Kypseli 3'14
 Antetokounmpo 2'42
 Nothing Like Them – Single (Keep Shelly in Athens, 2021)
 Nothing Like Them 4'01
 Upside Down – Single  (Keep Shelly in Athens, 2022)
Upside Down 3'15
 Sick – Single  (Keep Shelly in Athens, 2022)
 Sick 3'40
 Among Wolves – Single  (Keep Shelly in Athens, 2022)
 Among Wolves 2'58
 Mostly International 3'30

Albums 
 In Love With Dusk / Our Own Dream (2012) (LP on Forest Family Records, CD on Plancha/Art Union)
 At Home (2013) (LP on Cascine, CD on Plancha/Art Union)
 Now I'm Ready (2015) (Friends Of Friends)
 Philokalia (2017) (Athenian Aura Recordings)

Remixes 
 Porcelain Raft – Tip of Your Tongue (Keep Shelly in Athens Remix) (from Tip of Your Tongue Remixes) (Acéphale, 2010)
 Tropics – Mouves (Keep Shelly in Athens Remix) (from Mouves) (Planet Mu, 2010)
 Body Language – You Can (Keep Shelly in Athens Remix) (from Social Studies) (Body Language Self-Released, 2011)
 Crazy P – Wecanonlybewhoweare (Keep Shelley in Athens Mix) (from Wecanonlybewhoweare (Keep Shelley in Athens Mix)) (Crazy P Self-Released, 2011)
 Tycho – Dive (Keep Shelly in Athens Remix) (from Dive) (Ghostly International, 2012)

Special appearances 
 MMOTHS – Heart (from EP) (Street Quality Entertainment, 2012)
 The New Division – Night Escape (from Night Escape EP) (Division 87, 2012)
 Plastic Flowers – Ghosts (from "Evergreen") (Inner Ear Records/Crash Symbols, 2014)

Compilation appearances 
 Running Out Of You (DannielRadall Remix) appears on Beko_Amdiscs1 (BEKODSL & AMDISCS, 2010)
 Song To Cheer You Up appears on DYVNZMBR (DZ TAPES, 2011)
 Running Out Of You (Memory Tapes Remix) appears on Memory Tapes – Player Piano (Something In Construction, 2011)
 Hauntin' Me appears on Weekly Magic Tape No. 9 (Magic, 2011)
 Our Own Dream appears on Weekly Magic Tape No. 37 (Magic, 2011)
 In Love With Dusk appears on Keep It Yours Records Compilation Vol.1 (Keep It Yours Records, 2011)
 Just Like Honey appears on Just Like Honey (Just Like Honey, 2011) 
 DIY (Sasha Involv3r Remix) appears on Sasha Involv3r (Ministry of Sound, 2013)

References

External links 
Official website
Keep Shelly in Athens on Facebook
Keep Shelly in Athens on Soundcloud
Forest Family Records
 Cascine (current label)
Keep Shelly in Athens on Insound KSIA's in-print releases can always be found here.

Musical groups established in 2010
Greek musical groups
Musical groups from Athens
Electronic music duos
Dream pop musical groups
Indie pop groups
Electronica music groups
Cascine artists
Planet Mu artists
2010 establishments in Greece